KGRU-LP (96.1 FM) was a radio station broadcasting a religious format. Licensed to Ellensburg, Washington, United States, the station was owned by The Great Round-Up Cowboy Church.

The station's license was surrendered to the Federal Communications Commission for cancellation on September 23, 2016.

References

External links
 

Defunct radio stations in the United States
GRU-LP
GRU-LP
Kittitas County, Washington
Radio stations established in 2004
2004 establishments in Washington (state)
Defunct religious radio stations in the United States
Radio stations disestablished in 2016
2016 disestablishments in Washington (state)
GRU-LP